Gređani is a village in Croatia.

References

Populated places in Brod-Posavina County